Juan Manuel Eguiagaray (born 1945) is a Spanish economist, academic, businessman and retired politician. He served as the minister of industry and energy from 1993 to 1996.

Early life and education
Eguiagaray was born into a family of Basque origin in Bilbao in 1945. He received degrees in economics and law from the University of Deusto in Bilbao and holds a PhD degree in economics.

Career
From 1970 to 1982 Eguiagaray taught economics at the University of Deusto. In the 1970s he entered politics and became a member of the PSOE. He was also named a member of the PSOE's executive committee. He was elected to the Spanish Parliament, representing Murcia province. He was named the minister for public administration in 1991 in the cabinet of Prime Minister Felipe Gonzales replacing Joaquín Almunia in the post. He served in the post until 1993 when he was appointed minister for industry and energy in a cabinet reshuffle and replaced Claudio Aranzadi in the post. Eguiagaray was in office until 1996 and retired from politics in 2001.

After leaving politics, Eguiagaray returned to teaching. He taught macroeconomics and applied economics, and was an associate professor at Carlos III University in Madrid until 30 September 2006. He also served as the director of the European Aeronautic Defence and Space Company until February 2013. He is the director of studies at the Fundación Alternativas, a Madrid-based think tank.

References

External links

20th-century Spanish  economists
1945 births
Airbus people
Academic staff of the Charles III University of Madrid
Government ministers of Spain
Living people
Members of the 2nd Basque Parliament
Members of the 3rd Basque Parliament
Members of the 6th Congress of Deputies (Spain)
Members of the 7th Congress of Deputies (Spain)
Politicians from Bilbao
Spanish corporate directors
Members of the 1st Basque Parliament
Spanish Socialist Workers' Party politicians
University of Deusto alumni
Academic staff of the University of Deusto